Simón Alberto Contreras Valenzuela (born 29 March 2002), nicknamed Pitu, is a Chilean footballer who plays as a forward for Deportes Magallanes on loan from Universidad de Chile.

Club career
On 2020 season, he made his professional debut playing for Universidad de Chile in a Primera División match against Deportes La Serena. Later, he signed his first contract as a professional footballer on January 11, 2021. 

On second half 2022, he was loaned to Universidad de Concepción in the Primera B de Chile.

International career
He represented Chile U20 in a friendly tournament played in Teresópolis (Brazil) called Granja Comary International Tournament. At these tournament, he played in two matches against Peru U20 and Brazil U20.

Personal life
He is cousin of the members of the Chilean dancing duo Power Peralta.

References

External links
 

2002 births
Living people
People from Santiago Province, Chile
Chilean footballers
Chile under-20 international footballers
Chilean Primera División players
Primera B de Chile players
Universidad de Chile footballers
Universidad de Concepción footballers
Association football forwards
Footballers from Santiago